A shepherd's crook is a long and sturdy stick with a hook at one end, often with the point flared outwards, used by a shepherd to manage and sometimes catch sheep. In addition, the crook may aid in defending against attack by predators.  When traversing rough terrain, a crook is an aid to balance.  Shepherds may also use the long implement to part thick undergrowth (for example at the edge of a drovers' road) when searching for lost sheep or potential predators.

Symbolic use
The innovation of a hook facilitates the recovery of fallen animals by ensnaring them by the neck or leg. For this reason the crook has been used as a religious symbol of care (particularly in difficult circumstances), including the Christian bishop's crosier.

In medicine, the term shepherd’s crook is used to describe a right coronary artery that follows an unusually high and winding route. This variant, which has a prevalence of about 5%, imposes technical problems in angioplasty procedures.

The letter lamed originated as a representation of a shepherd's crook or goad, from which the Latin letter L has evolved.

Thalia, Muse of comedy in Greek mythology, was usually portrayed holding a shepherd's crook.

The shepherd's crook and the flail (an agricultural tool) are insignia of pharaonic authority.

Gallery

See also
 Flail
 Flail (weapon)
 Crook and flail
 shepherd's hat

References

External links

Animal husbandry occupations
Farming tools
Livestock herding equipment
Sheep farming
Ritual weapons
Honorary weapons
Ceremonial weapons